Firefox Lite, formerly Firefox Rocket, was a lightweight free and open-source web browser developed by Mozilla for Android smartphones and tablets. Initially released only in Indonesia, it was available in various emerging markets. With an APK size of 7 MB, it featured Turbo Mode (enabled by default), which blocked third-party content of web pages such as ads and trackers, and a toggle to disable web images, to speed page loads and use less mobile data. In addition, it had a private browsing mode, tabs, night mode, and the ability to screenshot the entire page. It used the built-in Android WebView as the browser engine. Due to release of the refreshed Firefox for Android and Firefox Focus, that contains Firefox Lite capabilities and replaced it, support for Firefox Lite ended on June 30, 2021.

See also 

 Firefox for Android
 Firefox Focus
 Puffin Browser
 Opera Mini

References 

Firefox
Android (operating system) software